Sasan Gir railway station is a small railway station in Gir Somnath district, Gujarat. Its code is SASG. It serves Sasan Gir village. The station consists of one platform. The platform is not well sheltered. It lacks many facilities including water and sanitation.

Major trains

 52951/52952 Delvada–Junagadh MG Passenger (unreserved)
 52929/52930 Dhasa–Veraval MG Passenger (unreserved)
 52933/52946 Dhasa–Veraval MG Passenger (unreserved)

References

External links 

 Gir National Park
 Gir lion Safari Booking

Railway stations in Gir Somnath district
Bhavnagar railway division